Boguchar is a town and the administrative center of Bogucharsky District in Voronezh Oblast, Russia, located on the Boguchar River (a tributary of the Don),  south of Voronezh, the administrative center of the oblast. Population:

History
Isaac Massa's map of Southern Russia printed in 1638 indicates a settlement near the confluence of the Boguchar River with Don called Bogunar (an apparent misspelling caused by the similarity of Cyrillic letters ч (ch) and н (n)). However, it is located on a different place than present-day Boguchar, in particular, on the left bank of the Don River. This area was inhabited by Don Cossacks in the 17th century, but was devastated during the suppression of the Bulavin Rebellion (1707–08), in which the upper Don Cossacks were active participants. Afterwards, the area has never been a part of the Don Cossack Host, but rather of Sloboda Ukraine and later Voronezh Governorate, since it was settled by the  cossacks of Ukrainian ethnicity in the years 1716–17. The town status was granted to Boguchar in 1779.

Administrative and municipal status
Within the framework of administrative divisions, Boguchar serves as the administrative center of Bogucharsky District. As an administrative division, it is incorporated within Bogucharsky District as Boguchar Urban Settlement. As a municipal division, this administrative unit also has urban settlement status and is a part of Bogucharsky Municipal District.

Military
Elements of the 3rd Motor Rifle Division of the Russian Ground Forces are based here, part of the 20th Guards Combined Arms Army, Western Military District.

References

Notes

Sources

External links
Official website of Boguchar 
Boguchar Business Directory 

Cities and towns in Voronezh Oblast
Bogucharsky Uyezd